How the Supersuckers Became the Greatest Rock and Roll Band in the World is a greatest hits album covering the years 1988 to 1998 of the American rock band Supersuckers. Released on August 24, 1999, it chronicles the Supersuckers during the years that they were signed to Sub Pop.

Track listing
 "Coattail Rider" – 2:30
 "Creepy Jackalope Eye" – 2:25
 "Born With A Tail" – 3:16
 "Luck" – 1:26
 "On The Couch" – 2:31
 "Doublewide" – 2:17
 "Hot Rod Rally" – 1:55
 "She's My Bitch" – 1:45
 "Bad, Bad, Bad" – 2:21
 "Dead In The Water" – 2:14
 "How To Maximize Your Kill Count" – 1:55
 "Ron's Got The Cocaine" – 1:22
 "Roadworn And Weary" – 3:31
 "Supersucker Drive-By Blues" – 2:35
 "Givin' It Away" – 2:11
 "All Right" – 0:18
 "Saddletramp" – 2:02
 "Can't Resist" – 2:21
 "Dead Homiez" – 3:08
 "Psyched Out" – 2:54
 "Hell City, Hell" – 2:05
 "Before They Make Me Run" – 3:48
 "Bloody Mary Morning" – 2:49
 "Wake Me When It's Over" – 3:35
 "Good Livin'" – 2:17
 "Monkey" – 5:07
 "Beat To Shit" – 1:43

Notes
"Dead Homiez" is a cover of the song by Ice Cube.
"Hell City, Hell" is a version performed with members of Zeke.
"Before They Make Me Run" is a cover of the song by the Rolling Stones performed with Steve Earle on vocals.
"Bloody Mary Morning" is a cover of the song by Willie Nelson with Nelson himself on guitar.
"Wake Me When It's Over" and "Monkey" are recordings with Eric Martin on vocals when the band was known as The Black Supersuckers.

Supersuckers albums
1999 greatest hits albums
Sub Pop compilation albums